"Bed of Roses" is a song by American rock band Bon Jovi, first appearing on their fifth studio album, Keep the Faith (1992), then released as a single on January 11, 1993. Jon Bon Jovi wrote the song in a hotel room while suffering from a hangover and the lyrics reflect his feelings at the time. The song contains drawn out guitar riffs and soft piano playing, along with emotive and high vocals by Jon Bon Jovi.

The song's power ballad style made it a worldwide hit, and it demonstrated the band's new, more mature sound after their success as a glam metal band in the 1980s. The single reached  10 on the US Billboard Hot 100, No. 2 on the Canadian RPM Top Singles chart, No. 13 on the UK Singles Chart, and No. 10 on the German Singles Chart.

Music video
The video for "Bed of Roses" begins with shots of Richie Sambora playing guitar high in the mountain tops, and then cuts to scenes of Jon alone in his hotel room, the band recording the song in the studio, and finally performing live on stage. Initially, the video directors wanted Jon Bon Jovi to be on the mountain tops, but Jon said: "I was on top of a mountain in 'Blaze of Glory', send them" (Richie Sambora and David Bryan, who is seen playing the piano at the mountain top).

The live portions were filmed at Stabler Arena in Bethlehem, Pennsylvania, on December 31, 1992, as part of a special 1992's New Year's Eve concert. In order to get the liveliest and largest crowd there for the video, the band made arrangements to have no floor seating, and to have one price, general admission tickets.

Track listing
International release
 "Bed of Roses" (edit) – 5:03
 "Lay Your Hands on Me" (live) – 5:30
 "Tokyo Road" (live) – 5:59
 "I'll Be There for You" (live) – 6:30

Charts and certifications

Weekly charts

Year-end charts

Certifications

Legacy
"Bed of Roses" became a staple on Bon Jovi setlists for years to come, and was featured on the band's Cross Road greatest hits album, and in acoustic style on This Left Feels Right. A live performance can be viewed on the Crush Tour DVD. A version with lyrics in Spanish was also recorded, entitled "Cama De Rosas".

The song was briefly featured in an episode of  Ms. Marvel, covered by a band called "Brown Jovi".

References

1990s ballads
1992 songs
1993 singles
Bon Jovi songs
Hard rock ballads
Mercury Records singles
Music videos directed by Wayne Isham
Songs written by Jon Bon Jovi
Song recordings produced by Bob Rock